A slave ship is a vessel used to transport slaves.

Slave Ship may also refer to:

 The Slave Ship, a painting by J. M. W. Turner
 Slave Ship (Jeter novel), a 1998 science fiction novel by K. W. Jeter
 Slave Ship (Pohl novel), a 1956 science fiction novel by Frederik Pohl
 Slave Ship (1937 film), starring Warner Baxter and Wallace Beery
 "Slave Ship", a song by Jolin Tsai for the 2003 album Magic
 "Stalins slave ships", ships the Soviet government used to transport political prisoners in the Soviet Far East in the 1930s; see Dalstroy#Ships of the Dalstroy

See also
 Hell ship, a ship with extremely unpleasant living conditions or with a reputation for cruelty among the crew